The Nacional Chambers of Commerce, Services and Tourism (abb. CANACO) are local chambers of commerce in Mexico. They are represented at the national level by CONCANACO, (National Confederation of the Chambers of Commerce).

References 

Business organizations based in Mexico
Chambers of commerce